V J Sabu Joseph is a film editor working in the Tamil Film Industry. His work on Vallinam brought him the National Film Award for Best Editing in the year 2013–2014.

Film career

He entered his Film Editing career in 2002.  He had previously worked as an associate Film editor with prominent Film editors-JN Harsha and Anthony before establishing himself as an Independent Editor. The First film to be edited by him was ‘Aanmai Thavarael’ (2011). He went on to win a National award for his work on Vallinam (2014). The Directorate of film Awards acclaimed the work with the award and cited the following comment "An excellent pace set in this sport based film by the editor. The match sequences have been masterly cut."

Filmography

Awards

National Film Awards
 2013-2014 – National Film Award for Best Editing for Vallinam

References

External links 
 
 

Tamil film editors
Living people
1981 births
Best Editor National Film Award winners
Artists from Chennai
Film editors from Tamil Nadu